Grapple may refer to:

Actions 
 Grappling, techniques, maneuvers, and counters applied to an opponent in order to gain a physical advantage
 Grapple tackle, a controversial tackling technique used in rugby league
 Submission wrestling (also submission grappling), a formula of competition

Technology and vehicles 
 Grapple (tool), a hook or claw used to catch or hold something
 Grapple skidder, type of heavy vehicle used in a logging operation for pulling cut trees out of a forest
 Grapple truck, a truck that has a grapple loader mounted to its frame
 Grapple (network layer), a free software package for adding multiplayer support to computer games and applications
 Grapple fixture, on spacecraft or other objects to provide a secure connection for a robotic arm

Military 
 Operation Grapple, a series of United Kingdom nuclear weapon tests
 Operation Grapple (Yugoslavia), codename given to the deployment of British forces in Bosnia from 1992
 , a Safeguard-class salvage ship in the United States Navy
 , a Diver-class rescue and salvage ship commissioned by the U.S. Navy

Plants and food 
 Grāpple, the brand name of a commercially marketed grape-flavored apple
 A combination of grape and apple flavors
 Harpagophytum procumbens (also grapple plant), a plant of the sesame family

In fiction 
 Grapple (Transformers), an Autobot from the second season of The Transformers TV series
 Grappler (comics), a fictional character in the Marvel Universe
 Settling Accounts: The Grapple, the third book in the Settling Accounts series by Harry Turtledove

See also
 Grape (disambiguation)
 Grasp (disambiguation)
 Graupel